Maiorana is a surname. Notable people with the surname include:
 Bruno Maïorana (born 1966), French cartoonist
 Daniel Maiorana (born c. 1977), founder of a Swedish gang
 Giuliano Maiorana (born 1969), English footballer
 Marcello Maiorana (died 1586), Roman Catholic prelate
 Mark Maiorana (born 1956), American politician

See also
 Majorana

Latin-language surnames